Gammans Park is a public park in north Portland, Oregon's Arbor Lodge neighborhood, in the United States. The  park was acquired in 1910 when the wife of lawyer George G. Gammans gave the city six lots for a park that would memorialize him.

See also
 List of parks in Portland, Oregon

References

External links
 

1910 establishments in Oregon
Arbor Lodge, Portland, Oregon
Parks in Portland, Oregon